Schooner Fare is a  Maine-based folk band, consisting of Steve Romanoff (vocals, six and twelve-string guitar, five-string banjo), Chuck Romanoff (vocals, twelve-string guitar, tenor banjo), and formerly Tom Rowe (vocals, bass guitar, tin whistle). Schooner Fare performs primarily original maritime, socially conscious, and traditional folk music. They perform throughout Maine and North America, and their songs are played by radio stations and satellite radio worldwide.

History
Schooner Fare was formed in 1975. Chuck Romanoff, Steve Romanoff, and Tom Rowe were sitting around singing British folksinger, John Conolly's song, ("Fiddler's Green"), and enjoyed it to such an extent they began contemplating doing this for a living. Six months later, they had a Sunday booking in Portland for $150. They then got a steady job at a waterfront pub in Portland, Maine, The Holy Mackerel.
Schooner Fare continued to play, primarily in New England and eventually expanded their audience to Boston, New York City, Washington, D.C., Chicago, Minneapolis, Los Angeles, Seattle, and Calgary, Canada. The folk trio became regular performers at Alexandria, Virginia’s Birchmere. They became featured artists on Dick Cerri's "Music Americana" in Washington, D.C.. Schooner Fare was featured on CBS News' Sunday Morning with Charles Kuralt, CBS News Nightwatch with Charlie Rose, National Public Radio's Morning Edition and Weekend Edition with Scott Simon. They performed seven of their original songs with the Boston Pops Orchestra and have been described by New York's Lincoln Center for the Performing Arts as "The premier performing group of original and traditional songs."

Schooner Fare emerged from their "parent" group, Devonsquare, co-founded by Steve in 1965 as a trio. Chuck joined Devonsquare in 1971 and Tom in 1975 as a six-piece group. In mid-1975, Steve, Chuck, and Tom left Devonsquare and later formed Schooner Fare. They performed weekly while holding other jobs. They were discovered by Tommy Makem, formerly of the Clancy Brothers and Tommy Makem, folk icons of the 1960s. Makem had partnered with Liam Clancy and the two recorded Steve's song, "Day of the Clipper." Because the Makem and Clancy recording of "Clipper" established Schooner Fare as a de facto "Irish" band, this propelled them into larger venues, many of them famous Irish establishments in Boston (The Black Rose) and New York City (Tommy Makem's Irish Pavilion) and the Milwaukee Irish Fest. By 1981, Schooner Fare was a full-time performing ensemble performing throughout the U.S. mid-west and mid-Atlantic, and western and Atlantic Canada. Over the next several decades they recorded 15 albums, almost one-third being original songs. Schooner Fare has shared the stage and billings with most of the folk world's icons including Pete Seeger, Odetta, Tom Paxton, The Kingston Trio, Noel Paul Stookey, Peter Yarrow, Tom Rush, The Chad Mitchell Trio, The Limeliters, and The Highwaymen. Their original songs have been recorded by scores of other artists including Tommy Makem and Liam Clancy, Glenn Yarbrough, and The Fureys, A tape cassette of their songs traveled with astronaut Cpt. William F. Readdy aboard the NASA shuttle in 1992.

Tom Rowe died in January 2004. Since then, the Romanoff brothers continue to perform as Schooner Fare, now as a duo. They have released two albums since 2005.

Albums
 Day of the Clipper - 6/1/1978
 Closer to the Wind - 6/1/1981
 Alive! - 6/1/1983
 We the People - 7/10/1985
 The First Ten Years - 6/1/1986
 Home for the Holidays - 10/1/1987
 Classic Schooner Fare - 6/1/1989
 Signs of Home - 8/1/1990
 For the Times - 6/1/1993
 Finnegan's Wake - 6/2/1995
 Schooner Kids - 6/1/1997
 A 20th Anniversary Party - 6/1/1999
 Our Maine Songs - 6/15/1999
 And Both Shall Row - 10/1/2005
 Roots and Wings - 7/15/2010

External links
 Schooner Fare home page
 History of Schooner Fare
 Schooner Fare's Schedule
 Schooner Fare Facebook page

American folk musical groups
Musical groups from Maine
Musical groups from Portland, Maine
Musical groups established in 1975